These hits topped the Dutch Top 40 in 2004 (see 2004 in music).

Number-one artists

See also
2004 in music

2004 in the Netherlands
Netherlands
2004